Richard Fellowes Benyon (17 November 1811 – 26 July 1897), born Richard Fellowes, was a British Conservative politician and civil servant.

Richard was born at Haveringland Hall in Norfolk, the third son of William Henry Fellowes of Ramsey Abbey in Huntingdonshire and his wife, Emma, sister of Richard Benyon De Beauvoir of Englefield House in Berkshire.

He inherited this latter property (16,000 acres, worth 20,004 guineas rental per annum) and its associated estates upon his uncle's death in 1854 and changed his name to Benyon.

Educated at Charterhouse and St. John's College, Cambridge, he was a member of Boodle's, Carlton and Conservative London clubs.

In 1857 he was appointed High Sheriff of Berkshire, and was the Chairman of the County's Quarter Sessions in 1864. In 1860 he was elected the Member of Parliament for Berkshire, a position he held until his resignation in 1876. He was a patron of the Anti-Mendacity Society, the National Society for School Furniture and the Society for the Augmentation of Small Livings.

By his wife Elizabeth Mary Clutterbuck he had three daughters, and upon his death in 1897, his estates were inherited by his nephew, James Herbert Benyon. Meanwhile, his daughter Marion Emma had married Sir John Shelley, 9th Bt., and as a result of her cousins' own lack of sons with children, her younger son inherited Englefield in 1959. Thereby Richard Fellowes Benyon's great-grandson and eventual heir became Sir William Richard Benyon, whose son Richard Henry Ronald Benyon was MP for Newbury from 2005 to 2019 and inherited Englefield House.

References

External links 
 
Portrait at Berkshire Record Office
Royal Berkshire History: Englefield House

1811 births
1897 deaths
Conservative MPs
High Sheriffs of Berkshire
Members of the Parliament of the United Kingdom for Berkshire
People from Englefield, Berkshire
People from Broadland (district)
UK MPs 1859–1865
UK MPs 1865–1868
UK MPs 1868–1874
UK MPs 1874–1880
People educated at Charterhouse School
Alumni of St John's College, Cambridge
Benyon family